Instituto Oxford is a private school in Colonia Torres del Potrero, Álvaro Obregón, Mexico City. The school offers preschool through senior high school (bachillerato).

References

External links
 Instituto Oxford 

High schools in Mexico City